Cristina Ioriatti (born 19 January 1973) is an Italian former archer. She competed in the women's individual and team events at the 2000 Summer Olympics.

References

External links
 

1973 births
Living people
Italian female archers
Olympic archers of Italy
Archers at the 2000 Summer Olympics
Sportspeople from Trento